We Are Only What We Feel is the debut studio album by Swedish trio NONONO, released on 13 March 2014 through Warner Music. The album has peaked at number 41 on the Billboard Top Heatseekers chart.

Track listing

Personnel
Credits for We Are Only What We Feel adapted from AllMusic

NONONO
 Stina Wäppling – vocals
 Tobias "Astma" Jimson – engineering, production
 Michel "Rocwell" Flygare – engineering, production

Additional musicians
 Pelle Hansen – strings
 Pär Lindqvist – strings
 Fredrik Syberg – strings
 The West Los Angeles Children's Choir – vocals

Additional personnel
 Sören Von Maimborg – mastering, mixing
 Barbara Klaskin Silberg – direction
 Amir Chamdin – photography
 Johan Reinhold – artwork

Charts

Release history

References

2014 debut albums
NoNoNo (band) albums